The sixth season of the Canadian television comedy series Video on Trial premiered on MuchMusic on September 27, 2010 and concluded on August 29, 2011. It consists of 30 episodes.

Background
Video on Trial features music videos being humorously critiqued in a manner akin to a courtroom trial. The show's tongue-in-cheek manifesto, as announced in its original opening sequence, is seeing to it that "all music videos are brought to justice". A typical half-hour episode features five music videos being "tried" by a panel of five personalities acting as jurors.

The sixth season of Video on Trial retains the abridged episode format introduced midway through the fifth season.

Episodes

References

2010 Canadian television seasons
2011 Canadian television seasons